The Wimbledon Traincare Depot is a traction maintenance depot in England operated by South Western Railway. The depot is adjacent to the South West Main Line, located between Wimbledon and Earlsfield stations. The depot is one of the busiest in the country, with an average of 250 carriages maintained there each night.

History
The depot opened on 3 October 1974 on the site of the former Dunsford Road depot. In 1987, the allocation of the depot included Classes 414, 423 and 455 EMUs. , the depot maintains and services Classes 455, 458 and 707 EMUs. In future, all of these units will be replaced by Class 701s.

The facility achieved ISO 14001 accreditation in recognition of its environmental management policies.  On 19 September 2006, Wimbledon Traincare depot was selected as the winner of the Back Office Customer Service Team of the Year.

References

Sources

External links 

Buildings and structures in the London Borough of Merton
Buildings and structures in Wimbledon, London
Railway depots in London
Transport in the London Borough of Merton
Transport infrastructure completed in 1974
1974 establishments in England